Radoš Bulatović (born 5 June 1984) is a Serbian professional footballer who plays as a defender for Bratstvo Prigrevica.

Club career
Born in Titov Vrbas, Bulatović started out at Crvenka in the Serbian League Vojvodina, before switching to First League of Serbia and Montenegro club Hajduk Kula in the 2004 winter transfer window. He made 83 appearances and scored three goals in the top flight (including Serbian SuperLiga), helping the side qualify for UEFA competitions on two occasions. In early 2008, Bulatović was loaned out to Mladost Apatin. He joined fellow Serbian First League club Sevojno a year later, helping them reach the 2008–09 Serbian Cup final, but eventually lost to Partizan.

In June 2011, Bulatović moved abroad to Hungary and signed with Zalaegerszeg. He quickly returned to Serbia to play for Novi Pazar. In early 2013, Bulatović moved abroad for the second time and played briefly with Finnish champions HJK.

International career
Bulatović represented Serbia and Montenegro at under-21 level, recording two appearances in 2004.

Career statistics

Honours
Sevojno
 Serbian Cup: Runner-up 2008–09

References

External links

 
 
 
 

Association football defenders
Expatriate footballers in Finland
Expatriate footballers in Hungary
Expatriate footballers in Moldova
FC Dacia Chișinău players
First League of Serbia and Montenegro players
FK Crvenka players
FK Hajduk Kula players
FK Mladost Apatin players
FK Novi Pazar players
FK Radnički Niš players
FK Radnik Surdulica players
FK Sevojno players
FK Sloboda Užice players
Helsingin Jalkapalloklubi players
Moldovan Super Liga players
Nemzeti Bajnokság I players
People from Vrbas, Serbia
Serbia and Montenegro footballers
Serbia and Montenegro under-21 international footballers
Serbian expatriate footballers
Serbian expatriate sportspeople in Finland
Serbian expatriate sportspeople in Hungary
Serbian expatriate sportspeople in Moldova
Serbian First League players
Serbian footballers
Serbian SuperLiga players
Zalaegerszegi TE players
1984 births
Living people